Voivodes of Poland (since 1999) – list of politicians occupying the seat of voivodes in the Third Republic of Poland from the introduction of a new territorial division of Poland into 16 provinces in 1999 in connection with the administrative reform prepared by the government of Jerzy Buzek. Voivodes are appointed and dismissed by the Prime Minister and Council of Ministers.

List of Voivodes

References

See also
 Voivodeship marshal
 Voivodeship executive board
Lists of Polish politicians
Voivodeships of Poland